Dangerfield F. Talbert (March 8, 1878 – June 20, 1914) was an American baseball third baseman in the pre-Negro leagues.

Talbert was born in Platte City, Missouri and moved to Omaha, Nebraska, attending the public schools there. He began his career as a baseball player at Omaha High School, working as a catcher at 16 years old.

Talbert came to Chicago in 1900 signing with W. S. Peters' Chicago Unions, playing third base where he stayed for most of his career. He played mostly for Chicago teams, with the exception of a couple years with the Algona Brownies of Iowa.

He played a winter season with the Cuban X-Giants and returned again for regular season play with the Leland Giants.

Talbert played with the Leland Giants until a court battle split the team in 1910. Wright went with Frank Leland to the Chicago Giants and played there in 1910. He was released from his contract from the Chicago Giants in late July, but returned in 1911.

He played with and against many well-known names of the day, including Rube Foster, Sol White, Henry W. Moore, William Binga, Walter Ball, and Charles "Joe" Green.

In 1913, Talbert was diagnosed with consumption, today known as tuberculosis and in May 1913, his friend and former teammate Rube Foster held a benefit baseball game for Talbert raising a reported $265. Omaha baseball supporters also held a benefit four months later at an Omaha ballpark.

After more than a year with the disease, Danger Talbert died at the home of his sister in Omaha, Nebraska at the age of 36. He was buried at Laurel Hill cemetery.

References

External links

Baseball players from Missouri
People from Platte City, Missouri
1878 births
1914 deaths
Algona Brownies players
Chicago Giants players
Cuban X-Giants players
Leland Giants players
20th-century deaths from tuberculosis
Tuberculosis deaths in Nebraska
20th-century African-American people